Achères-la-Forêt is a commune in the Seine-et-Marne department in the Île-de-France region in north-central France.

Population

The inhabitants are called Achérois.

Places of interest
 Sainte-Fare church (12th to 15th centuries, Romanesque architecture), historical monument

See also
Communes of the Seine-et-Marne department

References

External links

1999 Land Use, from IAURIF (Institute for Urban Planning and Development pr the Paris-Île-de-France région) 

Communes of Seine-et-Marne